Deerhoof vs. Evil is the tenth studio album by the band Deerhoof. It was released on January 6, 2011 on P-Vine Records in Japan, January 24, 2011 on ATP Recordings in the United Kingdom, January 25, 2011 on Polyvinyl in the USA, and January 30, 2011 on Flying Nun Records in New Zealand.

The band released the album one track at a time via different media outlets online, with a full map and schedule available on their own website. The first song released was "The Merry Barracks", which streamed on October 8, 2010, via the US website Pitchfork Media.

Reception

Deerhoof vs. Evil currently holds a score of 77 on the music review aggregator Metacritic, indicating "generally favorable reviews." Awarding the album 4 out of 5 stars, AllMusic critic Heather Phares noted "[the album] is proof that, once again, Deerhoof can craft something fresh and different after so many albums. In their world, evil and boredom are practically the same thing, and Deerhoof vs. Evil triumphs against both".

Track listing

Personnel
Deerhoof - performance, production
Greg Saunier - mastering, mixing
Matthew Goldman - design, art direction
Sarah Cass - photography

References

2011 albums
Deerhoof albums
Polyvinyl Record Co. albums
Flying Nun Records albums
ATP Recordings albums